stadiums

Kazakhstan
Football stadiums